Emil Arlt was a Swiss footballer who played for FC Basel for two seasons. He played mainly as a forward, but also as a midfielder.

Arlt joined the first team of FC Basel in 1926. He made his debut for the club in the away game on 10 October 1926 against Old Boys. Basel won the game by four goals to one and Arlt scored two goals in this match. Between 1926 and 1928 he played 29 games for Basel and scored 23 goals; 19 games were in the Swiss Serie A, 2 in the Swiss Cup and 8 were friendlies. He scored 14 goals in the domestic league, the other 9 were scored during the friendlies.

References

Sources
 Rotblau: Jahrbuch Saison 2017/2018. Publisher: FC Basel Marketing AG. 
 Die ersten 125 Jahre. Publisher: Josef Zindel im Friedrich Reinhardt Verlag, Basel. 
 Verein "Basler Fussballarchiv" Homepage

FC Basel players
Swiss men's footballers
Association football midfielders
Association football forwards